Lassina Zerbo (born 10 October 1963) is a Burkinabé politician and scientist who served as the Prime Minister of Burkina Faso from 2021 to 2022. Prior to that he was the Executive Secretary of the Comprehensive Nuclear-Test-Ban Treaty Organization. On 24 January 2022, Zerbo was deposed in a coup d'état.

Early life and education
Zerbo obtained a PhD in Geophysics from the Université de Paris XI, France, in 1993.

Career

Early career
Zerbo's international career started with a position as a research geophysicist with BHP Minerals International. He subsequently worked as project geophysicist for the company's Africa programmes, based in Virginia, USA, and provided technical expertise to all its airborne electromagnetics projects. Upon joining Anglo American Exploration in 1995, Zerbo assumed the role of Divisional Principal Geophysicist for Africa while supervising research and development projects for most of the company's projects in Africa, Asia and Australia. In this role, he managed all Africa operations through projects across the continent.

As Director of the CTBTO's International Data Centre (IDC) from 2004 to 2013, he was the focal point on CTBT issues related to the nuclear tests conducted by the Democratic People's Republic of Korea in 2006, 2009 and 2013. Zerbo led the CTBT Science and Technology conferences in 2011 and 2013 and managed the successful deployment of the CTBT virtual Data Exploitation Centre (vDEC), which provides an innovative framework for interacting with the wider scientific community. This interaction helps ensure that the CTBTO retains its position at the cutting edge of verification-related science and technology.

Executive Secretary of the CTBTO
Dr Zerbo was elected as Executive Secretary in November 2013, assuming the position in August 2014. Dr Zerbo is noted for having established a number of initiatives including the establishment in 2014 of the Group of Eminent Persons (GEM), comprising internationally recognized personalities and experts to promote the Treaty's entry into force and to reinvigorate international endeavours to achieve this goal. In 2016, he announced the creation of the CTBTO Youth Group to also engage the younger generation in advancing the aims of the Treaty.

Zerbo secured China's resumed technical cooperation with the CTBTO, leading to the certification of the first five International Monitoring System stations on Chinese territory between 2016 and 2018. Zerbo also secured a commitment by Cuba to join the Treaty, announced in 2019.  The success of the Integrated Field Exercise 2014 in Jordan, the establishment of the Technology Support and Training (TeST) Centre in 2019, and the successful stewardship of the Organization’s mandate during the Covid-19 pandemic in 2020 reflected the CTBTO’s capabilities under his leadership.

In the aftermath of the 2004 Indian Ocean tsunami, Zerbo spearheaded technical discussions regarding the agreement on CTBTO technical assistance to tsunami warning centres. He served as the custodian of all technically sensitive information of the organization, which was called on following the earthquake, tsunami and Fukushima nuclear power plant accident in Japan in March 2011.

Prime Minister of Burkina Faso
On 10 December 2021, Roch Marc Christian Kaboré named Zerbo as Burkina Faso’s new Prime Minister.

On 23 January 2022, Zerbo and Kaboré were deposed in a coup led by military officer Paul-Henri Sandaogo Damiba who took over as President of Burkina Faso.

Other activities
 International Gender Champions (IGC), Member
 World Economic Forum (WEF), Co-chair of the Global Agenda Council (GAC) on Nuclear Security

Recognition
Zerbo was chosen by the American Association for the Advancement of Science (AAAS) to receive its 2018 Award for Science Diplomacy in recognition of his commitment to eliminating nuclear testing.  Announcing the award, the AAAS said Zerbo was selected  for “using his scientific expertise and leadership ability to tackle difficult challenges and promote world peace.”

In recognition of his work at the CTBTO and in the disarmament and nuclear proliferation field in general, Zerbo was awarded the 2013 “Arms Control Person of the Year” by the Arms Control Association, USA.

In 2015 he became a Commander of the National Order of Burkina Faso for his work towards the preservation of peace and international security.

He was also decorated with the Grand Cross in the Chilean Order of Bernardo O'Higgins in June 2016.

In February 2017, Zerbo was awarded the Presidential Medal on the occasion of the 25th anniversary of the Republic of Kazakhstan for his leadership in enhancing nuclear non-proliferation efforts.

In August 2017, Zerbo received Special Honorary Citizenship of the City of Hiroshima for his initiatives to “preserve, disseminate and convey” the reality of atomic bombings, and his leadership efforts—including through the activities of the GEM—to promote the message of Hiroshima and the Hibakusha.

In August 2019 Zerbo was awarded the Republic of Kazakhstan's Nazarbayev Prize for a Nuclear-Weapons-Free World and Global Security, jointly with the late Director of the International Atomic Energy Angency, Yukiya Amano.

In September 2019, he was awarded the Order of Merit of the Republic of Madagascar in recognition of his leadership, his action on capacity building, and his promotion of multilingualism. Zerbo was also appointed Honorary Professor at the Autonomous University of Santo Domingo, Dominican Republic, in October 2019. Cited for his outstanding contribution to nuclear disarmament and peace in the world, Zerbo was presented with Development Champion Award of the Forum for Rebranding Africa in November 2019.

Personal life
Zerbo is married and has three daughters.

References

External links
 
 

1963 births
Living people
21st-century Burkinabé people
Burkinabé scientists
Comprehensive Nuclear-Test-Ban Treaty
Geophysicists
Prime Ministers of Burkina Faso
20th-century Burkinabé people
21st-century physicists
20th-century physicists
Leaders ousted by a coup